The athletics at the 1970 Asian Games were held in Bangkok, Thailand.

Medalists

Men

Women

Medal table

References
Asian Games Results. GBR Athletics. Retrieved on 2014-10-04.
Women's relay medallists. Incheon2014. Retrieved on 2014-10-04.
Men's relay medallists. Incheon2014. Retrieved on 2014-10-04.

 
1970 Asian Games events
1970
Asian Games
1970 Asian